Bedellia ehikella is a moth in the family Bedelliidae. It is found in Ukraine, Spain, Sardinia, Italy, Croatia, the Czech Republic and Hungary.

Adults are on wing from late March to mid-May and again from July to September in Ukraine.

The larvae feed on Convolvulus cantabrica. They mine the leaves of their host plant. The mine starts as a narrow tortuous corridor with a central frass line, that often cuts off part of the leaf. Later, larvae leave the mine and begin to make a series of full depth fleck mines. Pupation takes place outside of the leaf.

External links
A Review of the Lyonetiid Moths (Lepidoptera, Lyonetiidae): II. The Subfamilies Lyonetiinae and Bedelliinae
bladmineerders.nl

Bedelliidae
Moths of Europe